Fantana may refer to:

Places in Romania: see Fântâna (disambiguation)

Other uses:
 USS Fantana (SP-71), a United States Navy patrol boat in commission from 1917 to 1919
 Fantanas, a group of spokesmodels for Fanta
 Fantana (musical), a 1905 musical by John Raymond Hubbell
 Brian Fantana, a character in the comedy films Anchorman: The Legend of Ron Burgundy and Anchorman 2: The Legend Continues, played by Paul Rudd